The 2012–13 Milwaukee Panthers men's basketball team represented the University of Wisconsin–Milwaukee during the 2012–13 NCAA Division I men's basketball season. The Panthers, led by head coach Rob Jeter, played their home games at the Klotsche Center and were members of the Horizon League. They finished the season 8–24, 3–13 in Horizon League play to finish in last place. They lost in the first round of the Horizon League tournament to Green Bay.

Roster

2012–13 Schedule and results
All conference games are aired on horizon league.com

|-
!colspan=9| Exhibition

|-
!colspan=9| Regular season

|-
!colspan=9|Horizon League tournament

References

Milwaukee
Milwaukee Panthers men's basketball seasons